In chemistry and biochemistry, the Henderson–Hasselbalch equation

relates the pH of a chemical solution of a weak acid to the numerical value of the acid dissociation constant, Ka, of acid and the ratio of the concentrations,  of the acid and its conjugate base in an equilibrium. 

For example, the acid may be acetic acid 
 
The Henderson–Hasselbalch equation can be used to estimate the pH of a buffer solution by approximating the actual concentration ratio as the ratio of the analytical concentrations of the acid and of a salt, MA. 

The equation can also be applied to bases by specifying the protonated form of the base as the acid. For example, with an amine,

Derivation, assumptions and limitations

A simple buffer solution consists of a solution of an acid and a salt of the conjugate base of the acid. For example, the acid may be acetic acid and the salt may be sodium acetate.
The Henderson–Hasselbalch equation relates the pH of a solution containing a mixture of the two components to the acid dissociation constant, Ka of the acid, and the concentrations of the species in solution. 
 

To derive the equation a number of simplifying assumptions have to be made. (pdf)

Assumption 1: The acid, HA, is monobasic and dissociates according to the equations

CA is the analytical concentration of the acid and CH is the concentration the hydrogen ion that has been added to the solution. The self-dissociation of water is ignored. A quantity in square brackets, [X], represents the concentration of the chemical substance X. It is understood that the symbol H+ stands for the hydrated hydronium ion. Ka is an acid dissociation constant.

The Henderson–Hasselbalch equation can be applied to a polybasic acid only if its consecutive pK values differ by at least 3. Phosphoric acid is such an acid.

Assumption 2. The self-ionization of water can be ignored.
This assumption is not, strictly speaking, valid with pH values close to 7, half the value of pKw, the constant for self-ionization of water. In this case the mass-balance equation for hydrogen should be extended to take account of the self-ionization of water.

However, the term  can be omitted to a good approximation.

Assumption 3: The salt MA is completely dissociated in solution. For example, with sodium acetate

the concentration of the sodium ion, [Na+] can be ignored. This is a good approximation for 1:1 electrolytes, but not for salts of ions that have a higher charge such as magnesium sulphate, MgSO4, that form ion pairs.  

Assumption 4: The quotient of activity coefficients, is a constant under the experimental conditions covered by the calculations.

The thermodynamic equilibrium constant, 
 
is a product of a quotient of concentrations  and a quotient, of activity coefficients .
In these expressions, the quantities in square brackets signify the concentration of the undissociated acid, HA, of the hydrogen ion H+, and of the anion A−; the quantities  are the corresponding activity coefficients. If the quotient of activity coefficients can be assumed to be a constant which is independent of concentrations and pH, the dissociation constant, Ka can be expressed as a quotient of concentrations.     

Rearrangement of this expression and taking logarithms provides the Henderson–Hasselbalch equation

Application to bases
The equilibrium constant for the protonation of a base, B, 
 + H+  
is an association constant, Kb, which is simply related to the dissociation constant of the conjugate acid, BH+.

Thus, the Henderson–Hasselbalch equation can be used, without modification, for bases.

Biological applications
With homeostasis the pH of a biological solution is maintained at a constant value by adjusting the position of the equilibria

However, the solubility of carbonic acid in water may be exceeded. When this happens carbon dioxide gas is liberated and the following equation may be used instead.

 represents the carbon dioxide liberated as gas. In this equation, which is widely used in biochemistry,  is a mixed equilibrium constant relating to both chemical and solubility equilibria. It can be expressed as

History
In 1908, Lawrence Joseph Henderson derived an equation to calculate the hydrogen ion concentration of a bicarbonate buffer solution, which rearranged looks like this:

In 1909 Søren Peter Lauritz Sørensen introduced the pH terminology, which allowed Karl Albert Hasselbalch to re-express Henderson's equation in logarithmic terms, resulting in the Henderson–Hasselbalch equation.

See also
 Davenport diagram

Further reading

References

Acid–base chemistry
Equilibrium chemistry
Mathematics in medicine